John McGarrity (20 October 1925 – 2006) was a Scottish footballer who played as a goalkeeper for East Fife, Arbroath and Cowdenbeath.

McGarrity died in Cowdenbeath in 2006, at the age of 80.

References

External links

1925 births
2006 deaths
Date of death missing
Footballers from Fife
Scottish footballers
Association football goalkeepers
East Fife F.C. players
Arbroath F.C. players
Cowdenbeath F.C. players
Scottish Football League players
Scottish Junior Football Association players
Blairhall Colliery F.C. players